Squat lobsters are dorsoventrally flattened crustaceans with long tails held curled beneath the cephalothorax. They are found in the two superfamilies Galatheoidea and Chirostyloidea, which form part of the decapod infraorder Anomura, alongside groups including the hermit crabs and mole crabs. They are distributed worldwide in the oceans, and occur from near the surface to deep sea hydrothermal vents, with one species occupying caves above sea level. More than 900 species have been described, in around 60 genera. Some species form dense aggregations, either on the sea floor or in the water column, and a small number are commercially fished.

Description
The two main groups of squat lobsters share most features of their morphology. They resemble true lobsters in some ways, but are somewhat flattened dorsoventrally, and are typically smaller. As in other decapod crustaceans, the body of a squat lobster may be divided into two main regions: the cephalothorax (itself made up of the cephalon, or head, and the thorax), and the pleon or abdomen.

The cephalothorax is made of 13 body segments (somites), although the divisions are not obvious and are most easily inferred from the paired appendages. From front to back, these are, the two pairs of antennae, six pairs of mouthparts (mandibles, maxillae, maxillules and three pairs of maxillipeds), five pairs of pereiopods. The cephalothorax is covered with a thick carapace, which may extend forwards in front of the eyes to form a rostrum; this is highly variable among squat lobsters, being vestigial in Chirostylus, wide and often serrated in some genera, and long, narrow, and flanked with "supraorbital spines" in others. The degree of ornamentation on the surface of the carapace also varies widely, and there are almost always at least a few setae (bristles), which can be iridescent in some members of the Galatheidae and Munididae. A pair of compound eyes also project on stalks from the front of the carapace; these are made up of ommatidia with square facets, which is typical of the "reflecting superposition" form of eye. Many deep-sea species have reduced eyes, and reduced movement of the eyestalks. In the families Munididae and Galatheidae, there is often a row of setae close to the eyes, forming "eyelashes".

The most conspicuous appendages are the pereiopods, and the largest of these is the first pair. These each end in a chela (claw), and are therefore known as the "chelipeds"; they can be more than six times the body length, although some groups show sexual dimorphism, with females having proportionally shorter chelipeds. The following three pairs of pereiopods are somewhat smaller than the chelipeds and are without claws, but are otherwise similar; they are used for walking. The fifth pair of pereiopods are much smaller than the preceding pairs, and are held inconspicuously under the carapace. They each end in a tiny chela, and are generally believed to be used for cleaning the body, especially the gills, which are in a cavity protected by the carapace.

The pleon is made up of six somites, each bearing a pair of pleopods, and terminating in a telson. The first somite is narrower than the succeeding somites, and the last pair of pleopods are modified into uropods, which flank the telson. The pleon is usually curled under the thorax, such that only the first three somites are visible from above. The form of the pleopods varies between the sexes. In females, the first one or two pairs are missing, while the remaining pairs are uniramous, and have long setae, to which the eggs can be attached. In males, the first two pairs are formed into gonopods, and are used to transfer the spermatophore to the female during mating; the first pair is often missing. The remaining pleopods can be similar to those of the females, or reduced in size, or entirely absent. In both sexes, the uropods are biramous.

Ecology

The majority of squat lobsters are benthic, spending their lives on the sea-floor. A few, however, spend part of their lives living in the water column, often forming dense pelagic swarms of juveniles, especially in areas with high densities of plankton; this behaviour is seen in the species Pleuroncodes planipes (off Baja California, Mexico), P. monodon (Peru and Chile) and Munida gregaria (Otago, New Zealand and southernmost South America). Although Munida quadrispina also has pelagic juveniles, they have not been observed to form swarms. As well as these pelagic swarms, many species form dense aggregations on the sea floor. This is particularly prominent around hydrothermal vents, where species such as Shinkaia crosnieri are particularly abundant.

Munidopsis tenuimana exhibit ontogenetic migration, where they move up and down the water column as they grow, potentially in response to different local conditions and selective pressures. 

Fecundity or number of eggs increases with smaller sized eggs and increasing body size of the parent. This results in increasing incubation time and consequently, increased egg volume. 

Squat lobsters feed on a variety of foods, with some species filter feeding, while others are detritus-feeders, algal grazers, scavengers, predators, or sometimes cannibals. Some are highly specialised; Munidopsis andamanica is a deep-sea species that feeds only on sunken wood, including trees washed out to sea and timber from ship wrecks. Squat lobsters are large enough to be caught by top predators, and can thus form a "direct trophic shortcut" between the primary producers at the bottom of the food web, and the carnivores at the top.

In March 2022 it was reported that a squat lobster, possibly from the genus Munidopsis, had been filmed on the wreck of the Endurance, which sank in 1915 in the Antarctic. This was the first record of a living squat lobster in the Weddell Sea.

Fisheries
Flesh from these animals is often commercially sold in restaurants as "langostino" or sometimes dishonestly called "lobster" when incorporated in seafood dishes. As well as being used for human consumption, there is demand for squat lobster meat to be used as feed in fish farms and shrimp or prawn farms. This is in part because they contain astaxanthin, a pigment that helps to colour the meat of farmed salmon and trout.

Despite their worldwide distribution and great abundance, there are few functioning fisheries for squat lobsters. Experimental fisheries have occurred in several countries, including Argentina, Mexico, and New Zealand, but commercial exploitation is currently restricted to Latin America, and chiefly to Chile. The main target species are Pleuroncodes monodon, P. planipes, and Cervimunida johni.

In Central America, the primary species of squat lobster targeted by fisheries is a species of Pleuroncodes. There is a great deal of confusion over both scientific names and common names, and the exact species is often unknown. In El Salvador, for instance, the commercial catch is generally referred to as "P. planipes", but is in fact P. monodon. Commercial fishing for squat lobsters in El Salvador began in the early 1980s; production increased markedly in the 2001 season, and has continued to grow, now making up 98% of the demersal resources landed in El Salvador, with annual catches peaking at 13,708 t in 2005. In Costa Rica, aggregations of squat lobsters are avoided, as the fishermen fear the squat lobsters will clog their nets. In Nicaragua, squat lobsters are heavily exploited, especially following a large increase in fishing effort in the 2007 season. In Panama, production reached 492 t in 2008. Chilean squat lobster fisheries initially targeted Cervimunida johni, beginning in 1953. By the mid-1960s, effort had largely switched to P. monodon. In an effort to conserve stocks, the Chilean government instituted quotas for squat lobsters, and the fishery is closely monitored. In New Zealand, Munida gregaria has been considered as a potential fisheries resource, particularly to feed farmed Chinook salmon (Oncorhynchus tshawytscha).

Classification

In early classifications, squat lobsters were placed together in the superfamily Galatheoidea alongside the porcelain crabs of the family Porcellanidae. In the early 21st century, however, the assumption that the various families of squat lobster were closely related began to be questioned. Although superficially similar, there were few morphological characteristics that united the squat lobsters to the exclusion of other families in the Anomura. With extensive DNA sequence data, it is now accepted that squat lobsters do not make up a single, monophyletic group. Rather, the Chirostylidae and Kiwaidae are only relatively distantly related to the other squat lobsters, and are closer to hermit crabs and king crabs (Paguroidea), the mole crabs in the superfamily Hippoidea, and the small families Lomisidae and Aeglidae. Squat lobsters are therefore divided among two superfamilies:
 Chirostyloidea – containing the families Chirostylidae, Eumunididae, and Kiwaidae
 Galatheoidea – containing the squat lobster families Galatheidae, Munididae, Munidopsidae, and the porcelain crabs in the family Porcellanidae
They contain a total of around 60 genera, divided into over 900 recognised species; more than 120 undescribed species are also thought to exist. The centre of diversity for squat lobsters is the "coral triangle", or Indo-Australian Archipelago, especially in the region of New Caledonia (with more than 300 species) and the region of Indonesia and the Philippines.

Fossil galatheoid squat lobsters have been found in strata dating back to the Middle Jurassic of Europe, but no fossils can be confidently assigned to the Chirostyloidea, although Pristinaspina may belong either in the family Kiwaidae or Chirostylidae.

References

External links

 
Anomura
Edible crustaceans
Commercial crustaceans
Arthropod common names